WSKG-TV (channel 46) is a PBS member television station in Binghamton, New York, United States. It is owned by the WSKG Public Telecommunications Council alongside NPR members WSKG-FM (89.3) and WSQX-FM (91.5). The three stations share studios on Gates Road in Vestal, New York; WSKG-TV's transmitter is located on Ingraham Hill in the town of Binghamton.

WSKA (channel 30) in Corning operates as a full-time satellite of WSKG-TV; this station's transmitter is located on Higman Hill. WSKA covers areas of south-central New York and north-central Pennsylvania that receive a marginal to non-existent over-the-air signal from WSKG, although there is significant overlap between the two stations' contours otherwise. WSKA is a straight simulcast of WSKG; on-air references to WSKA are limited to Federal Communications Commission (FCC)-mandated hourly station identifications during programming. Aside from the transmitter, WSKA does not maintain any physical presence in Corning or Elmira. WSKA had begun broadcasting as of fall 2006 as a repeater station of WSKG.

Overview

The station was named for Stanley Kiehl Gambell, a prominent local clergyman who was active in children's television programming.

In popular culture
The station was featured in the Where in the World Is Carmen Sandiego? episode "WSKGone", where the station was stolen by the character Wonder Rat. Mike Zeigler (the president of WSKG at the time) recorded a message for the gumshoes involving Mexican television network Televisa.

Technical information

Subchannels
The stations' digital signals are multiplexed:

Analog-to-digital conversion
WSKG-TV shut down its analog signal, over UHF channel 46, on June 12, 2009, the official date in which full-power television stations in the United States transitioned from analog to digital broadcasts under federal mandate. The station's digital signal remained on its pre-transition UHF channel 42. Through the use of PSIP, digital television receivers display the station's virtual channel as its former UHF analog channel 46.

Former repeaters
WSKG-TV once had many analog translators in operation across New York's Southern Tier. However, due to high operating costs, WSKG ceased the broadcasts, and surrendered the licenses of almost all of their television translators. W60AD (channel 60) in Savona, New York was their only TV translator remaining in recent years, until the repeater license was cancelled on January 13, 2012. It had an ERP of 650 watts.

References

External links

Television channels and stations established in 1968
1968 establishments in New York (state)
SKG-TV
PBS member stations